The Yaruro language (also spelled Llaruro or Yaruru; also called Yuapín or Pumé) is an indigenous language spoken by Yaruro people, along the Orinoco, Cinaruco, Meta, and Apure rivers of Venezuela. It is not well classified; it may be an isolate, or distantly related to the extinct Esmeralda language.

Genetic relations
Pache (2016) considers Yaruro to be related to the Chocoan languages, citing evidence from lexical and sound correspondences. Some shared lexical items between Yaruro and Chocoan (Pache (2016) cites Yaruro and Epena forms from the Intercontinental Dictionary Series):

{| class="wikitable"
! Yaruro !! Chocoan
|-
| dac͡ço ‘eye, face,’ c͡ço ‘seed, fruit, nut’ || Epena tautʰu ‘forehead’
|-
| da ‘eye’ (used in complex forms) || Proto-Chocoan **da ‘eye region,’ **da-ˈbu ‘eye,’ Epena ˈtau ‘eye’
|-
| duɾi ‘after’ || Proto-Chocoan **duˈɾi ‘tail’
|-
| ɡõã ‘meat, flesh,’ goe ‘blood’ || Proto-Emberá *uˈa ‘blood’
|-
| hu ‘bone,’ hu c͡çia ‘strong’ || Proto-Chocoan **huˈa ‘arm, hand,’ Epena huaˈtau ‘strong’
|-
| i ‘skin’ || Proto-Emberá *ˈe ‘skin’
|-
| ĩbu ‘nose’ || Proto-Chocoan **kẽˈbu ‘nose’
|-
| ic͡çi ‘hand’ || Epena iˈsia ‘wing’
|}

Language contact
Jolkesky (2016) notes that there are lexical similarities with the Saliba-Hodi, Arawak, Bora-Muinane, Choko, Witoto-Okaina, and Waorani language families due to contact.

Phonology

Consonants

Vowels

Vocabulary
Loukotka (1968) lists the following basic vocabulary items.

{| class="wikitable"
! gloss !! Yaruro
|-
| hand || ichi
|-
| foot || taho
|-
| man || oí
|-
| water || ui
|-
| star || boé
|-
| earth || dabú
|-
| dog || arerí
|-
| jaguar || panaumé
|-
| snake || póʔo
|-
| house || xoʔo
|-
| boat || dzyará
|}

Further reading
Obregón Muñoz, H. (1981). Léxico yaruro-español, español-yaruro. Caracas: Ministerio de Educación.

Notes

External links

Yaruro (Intercontinental Dictionary Series)

Indigenous languages of the South American Northern Foothills
Languages of Venezuela
Language isolates of South America
Esmeralda–Yaruroan languages